The Tyosha is a river in Nizhny Novgorod Oblast in Russia, a right tributary of the Oka. The Tyosha freezes up in November - first half of December and stays icebound until the second half of March - first half of April. Its biggest tributary is the Seryozha. The city of Arzamas is located on the Tyosha.

References 

Rivers of Nizhny Novgorod Oblast